Wan Air is a French airline based at Faa'a, Tahiti, French Polynesia, France. It now operates privately for the pearl industry and has ceased public transport operations.

History

The airline was established and started operations in 1987. It operated mainly passenger charter services, but also operated some scheduled services to nearby islands - Bora Bora, Huahine and Raiatea, as well as to outer islands including the Marquesas Islands, Austral Islands and Tuamotus. On 28 November 2004, Wan Air stopped public transport operations and now operates privately for the pearl industry.

Fleet

As of August 2006 the Wan Air fleet includes:

References

External links
Wan Air 

Airlines of France
Airlines of French Polynesia
Airlines established in 1987